Christian Tage Forter Wolmar (born 3 August 1949) is a British journalist, author, railway historian and Labour Party politician. He is known for his commentary on transport, especially as a pundit on Britain's railway industry, and was named Transport Journalist of the Year in the National Transport Awards in 2007. He is an advocate for cycling, and is on the board of the London Cycling Campaign as well as having founded Labour Cycles, which encourages the Labour Party to adopt a pro-cycling agenda.

Early life and education
Wolmar's father, Boris Forter,  was born in Moscow and his mother, Birgit Lindblom, was Swedish. They met in London.

Wolmar was educated at Lycée Français Charles de Gaulle, a French state-owned school in South Kensington, followed by the University of Warwick where he obtained a degree in economics and was editor of the student newspaper, Campus. He then squatted at Villa Road in London, helping to save the street from demolition, and co-edited the book Squatting the real story.

Life and career
Following his graduation from university in 1971, Wolmar worked for Marketing, Retail Newsagent, the New Statesman, and the London Daily News. In 1976, Wolmar joined the staff of drug users' charity Release, and stopped the use of its office (1 Elgin Avenue, London W9) as a holding address for the PIE, a paedophile activist group.

He was on the staff of The Independent (1989–97) and their transport correspondent for four years from 1992, covering the privatisation of British Rail by the Major government. He also contributed to The Observer and continues to write a regular column for RAIL magazine and contributes frequently to several other magazines.
His website has over 1,400 articles.

Wolmar's books and columns mainly analyse the current state of the British railway industry and also cover railway history.  He has long been an ardent critic of rail privatisation and argued that the structure contributed to the series of railway disasters in 1997–2001.

He is opposed to the construction of HS2, the planned high-speed railway linking London, Birmingham, Leeds and Manchester.

He frequently appears on TV and radio, both on history and news programmes, and has a regular spot as a commentator on Talk Radio. He speaks at transport conferences around the world, both on the railways and on his concerns about driverless cars.

Books
Wolmar's railway history books include The Subterranean Railway: a history of the London Underground, published in 2005, and Fire and Steam, the first major new history of the railways in Britain for 30 years. More recently, Blood, Iron and Gold, a history of how the railways changed the world, was published in October 2009 and Engines Of War, on how the railways transformed modern warfare was published in late 2010. In 2012, he published The Great Railway Revolution on the history of the US railroads, and also in 2012 an ebook version of On the Wrong Line: How Ideology and Incompetence Wrecked Britain's Railways, an updated version of the earlier Broken Rails. In 2013, he published To the Edge of the World, a history of the Transsiberian railway. 
Subsequent rail books include Railways and the Raj, a history of Indian railways and The Story of Crossrail. 
He has also written two polemics: Are Trams Socialist? describes how Britain's transport policies have always been orientated towards favouring the motor car over public transport and Driverless Cars: on a road to nowhere suggests that the hype around this technology is greatly exaggerated.

He has also written a book on the abuse scandals in children's homes, Forgotten Children, published in 2000, and has written extensively about housing issues and local government.

Politics

London Mayoral election, 2016
In September 2012, Wolmar announced his intention to seek nomination for the Labour candidacy at the 2016 Mayor of London elections. 
The WolmarforLondon campaign launched in 2013 with Wolmar chairing a panel on "One London" with Nick Raynsford, then MP for Greenwich and Woolwich, Simon Birkett, Founder and Director of Clean Air in London, Vidhya Alakeson, Deputy Director of the Resolution foundation and Councillor Lise Thorsen, Lead Councillor on Sustainability on the Copenhagen City Council. He held a second conference in June 2014, at The Exchange. Speakers included Neal Lawson, Chair of Compass and Professor Tony Travers LSE. Later he took part in the Labour Party Mayoral hustings at Manchester in September 2014 and unveiled plans to pedestrianise Oxford Street with boosts to business and the environment. Described by The Guardian as "the most extensive grass roots campaign", one poll put Wolmar in second place, with policies called Lifeblood for London, Putting a Roof over our Heads, Caring for the Capital's Well-Being and Hungry for Change. Wolmar jokingly encouraged newspapers to print an untrue rumour that he had been press officer for a Maoist slavery cult, saying, tongue-in-cheek, that it would be highly beneficial for his campaign financing.

In June 2015, after cycling over 2,000 miles and speaking at over 100 events, Wolmar won six Constituency Labour Party nominations, and went through to the final shortlist of the London Labour Party mayoral selection process. Described by The Londonist as "the non-politician who wants to be mayor", Wolmar spoke at the five official hustings about his campaign vision for a more affordable, liveable and sustainable London. The campaign persuaded the eventual winner, Sadiq Khan, to push for the pedestrianisation of Oxford Street and to introduce the 'Hopper' fare.

He received just over 5% of the total vote.

Wolmar supported Jeremy Corbyn in the 2015 Labour leadership election, saying that he was aiming to avoid a parliament in which Andy Burnham or Yvette Cooper are "basically trying to appease the Tories". In the 2016 Labour leadership election, Wolmar supported Corbyn's challenger Owen Smith.

Richmond Park by-election, 2016
Wolmar was selected as the Labour candidate to contest the Richmond Park constituency in the 2016 by-election and ran on a strongly Remain platform.

He said that he would vote against Article 50 in Parliament, adding that the EU referendum in June 2016 "was conducted on such dishonest terms that Parliament – or the electorate – needs to vote on the issue before a decision is made whether to leave the EU." He later said that his "view is that we [Labour] ought to be the party of Remain, we ought to be the party of the 48% and build on that". He also said that he opposes the expansion of Heathrow Airport.

Wolmar came third in the by-election, polling 1,515 votes, with 4% of the total vote, losing his deposit as the Liberal Democrat candidate Sarah Olney persuaded Labour voters to support her campaign to keep out the incumbent MP Zac Goldsmith.

Personal life
Wolmar lives in Holloway, London. He is a keen cricketer and distance runner, and plays tennis. He is a diehard football fan, having supported Queens Park Rangers (QPR) for over 50 years.

References

Bibliography
Stagecoach: A Classic Rags-to-Riches Tale from the Frontiers of Capitalism (rev. ed., 1999), 
Forgotten Children: The Secret Abuse Scandal in Children's Homes (2000), 
Broken Rails: How Privatisation Wrecked Britain's Railways (2001), 
Down the Tube: The Battle for London's Underground (2002), 
The Subterranean Railway: How the London Underground Was Built and How It Changed the City Forever (2004, revised 2020), 
On the Wrong Line: How Ideology and Incompetence Wrecked Britain's Railways (rev. ed. 2005),  (previously published as Broken Rails)
Fire And Steam: A New History of the Railways in Britain (2007),  
Blood, Iron and Gold: How The Railway Changed The World Forever (2009),  
Engines Of War: How Wars Were Won & Lost On The Railways (2010), 
The Great Railway Revolution: The Epic Story of the American Railroad (2012), 
On the Wrong Line: How Ideology and Incompetence Wrecked Britain's Railways (ebook, rev. ed. 2012), 
To the Edge of the World: The Story of the Trans-Siberian Express (2013), 
The Iron Road: The Illustrated History of Railways (2014), 
Are Trams Socialist?: Why Britain Has No Transport Policy (2016), 
 Railways and The Raj: How the Age of Steam Transformed India (2017), 
Cathedrals of Steam: How London’s Great Stations Were Built – And How They Transformed the City (2020), 
The Story of Crossrail: The Whole Story (2022),

External links
 

1949 births
Living people
People educated at Lycée Français Charles de Gaulle
Alumni of the University of Warwick
British male journalists
British people of Russian descent
British people of Swedish descent
Cycling in the United Kingdom
Labour Party (UK) parliamentary candidates
Politicians from London
Rail transport writers
20th-century squatters
Writers from London